Time (stylized as TIME) is the fifth studio album by Japanese singer Leo Ieiri. It was released on February 21, 2018 by Colourful Records. The album includes the singles "Zutto, Futari de" and "Relax" as well as a solo vocal take of the collaboration single "Koi no Hajimari".

Background and release
On December 20, 2017, Ieiri announced the release of her fifth studio album Time. It is Ieiri's first studio album in over a year in a half, since We (2016). The album was released in three different formats: a standard CD-only version, limited edition 'A', which comes with a DVD featuring Ieiri's 5th Anniversary Live at Zepp concert held on September 7, 2017 in its entirety, and limited edition 'B', which includes a different DVD featuring music videos, making-ofs and behind-the-scenes footage.

Commercial performance
Time entered the daily Oricon Albums Chart at number 3, selling 6,000 physical units on its first charting day. It peaked the following day at number 2, moving another 3,000 copies. The album debuted at number 4 on the weekly Oricon Albums chart with first week sales of 15,000 copies. The album also charted on multiple Billboard Japan charts: at number 3 on both the Hot Albums and Top Albums Sales charts and number 8 on the Download Albums chart.

Track listing

Charts

Sales

References

2018 albums
Leo Ieiri albums
Colourful Records albums